Israel competed in the Summer Olympic Games for the first time at the 1952 Summer Olympics in Helsinki, Finland. 25 competitors, 22 men and 3 women, took part in 17 events in 5 sports.

Results by event

Athletics

Basketball

Diving

Shooting

Four shooters represented Israel in 1952.

Swimming

References

External links
Official Olympic Reports

Nations at the 1952 Summer Olympics
1952 Summer Olympics
Summer Olympics